Woodnesborough is a village in the Dover District of Kent, England,  west of Sandwich. The population taken at the 2011 census included Coombe as well as Marshborough, and totalled 1,066. There is a Grade II* listed Anglican church dedicated to St Mary the Virgin.

History

Its name is first attested in the Domesday Book of 1086 as Golles-Wanesberge, with forms like Wodnesbeorge being attested a little later, around 1100, and as 'Wodnesbergh' in 1484. The name is believed to have meant Woden's hill/mound (Old English Wōdnes burh) after Anglo-Saxon god Woden (the English cognate of the Norse Odin, known in Proto-Germanic as Wodanaz); though some of the spellings also suggest *wænnes beorg ('hill of the mound'), from Old English wenn, wænn 'a tumour, blister, mound'. At the end of the eighteenth century there is a record of a burial mound beside the church, but the settlement also boasts a hill which could equally well have been described as a burh in Old English.

The village was once served by East Kent Light Railway and can now be reached by bus services from Sandwich.

There was also a post office, which closed at the end of January 2008.

Listed buildings
St Mary the Blessed Virgin Church: the village's 13th-century Anglican church is Grade II* listed, with 14th-century alterations and a Victorian restoration in 1884 by Ewan Christian. The building is made of flint and rubble and boasts an unusual ogee cupola, a design feature shared by nearby Sandwich's St Peter's Church.

Woodnesborough Village Hall: the building, a former school, dates from the 19th century.

Sundial north of the Church of St Mary the Virgin: dating from 1738 with the inscription "Woodnesborough W IB RG 1738".

Tomb Chest to Harrison family: situated about 2 metres W of Church of St Mary, and dating from 1777.

Summerfield House: an early 18th-century house with red brick and plain tiled roof.

Barn about 20m E of Summerfield House: a 17th-century barn now converted to a garage.

References

External links

Villages in Kent
Dover District
Civil parishes in Kent